The  Audi 920 is a car introduced in 1938 by the Audi division of Auto Union to replace the Audi Front UW 225. Its engine was a shortened version of the eight-cylinder in-line engine used by sister company Horch. The car was planned to occupy a niche in the Auto Union range between the large Horch products and the middle market cars produced by Wanderer. Audi had no stand-alone production facilities at that time and the car was produced, like its predecessor, at the Horch plant.

The 920 featured a front-mounted six-cylinder in-line engine with a displacement of 3,281 cc. A floor-mounted lever controlled the four-speed gearbox: this delivered power to the rear wheels, which represented a technological retreat from the innovative front-wheel drive configuration of the 920’s predecessor. The box-section chassis featured semi-independent suspension at the front and a swing-axle arrangement at the rear. The Audi 920 and the British Austin 16 were the only European cars to incorporate design cues from the 1937 Buicks for their front end grille treatment.

Production of almost all passenger cars came to an end in Germany as European war intensified. By the time production of the last pre-war Audi came to an end in 1940, 1,281 of the cars had been produced.

It was the last car to carry the Audi name until the Audi F103 in 1965, which marked the resurrection of the brand by Volkswagen shortly after its takeover of Auto Union the previous year. Audi would not market another car in the Obere Mittelklasse class until the Audi 100 came in 1968.

References

920
Executive cars
Auto Union
Rear-wheel-drive vehicles
Cars introduced in 1938
1930s cars
1940s cars